Standard time is the amount of time that should be allowed for an average worker to process one work unit using the standard method and working at a normal pace. The standard time includes some additional time, called the contingency allowance, to provide for the worker's personal needs, fatigue, and unavoidable delays during the shift.

Prerequisite for Valid Time Standards 
The task is performed by an average worker
The worker's pace represents standard performance
The worker uses the standard method
The task is performed on a standard work unit

Calculating the Standard Time 

The standard time (Ts) is calculated from multiplying the observed time (To) by the performance rating (R) and the personal need, fatigue and unavoidable delays (PFD):
Ts = To*R*(1+PFD)

Usages for Standard Time 
Estimate the quantity of the production
Determine workforce size and equipment requirement
Compare alternative methods
Evaluate worker's performance
Plan and schedule production and estimate co.

Further reading
Work Systems: The Methods, Measurement & Management of Work by Mikell P. Groover, Prentice-Hall (2006)  
Work Measurement and Methods Improvement by Lawrence S. Aft, Wiley (2000) 

Industrial engineering